M Swaraj (born 1979) is an Indian politician of the Communist Party of India (Marxist) and was a representative of Thripunithura constituency in the Kerala Legislative Assembly. He was the former Kerala State Secretary of Students' Federation of India and Democratic Youth Federation of India. He is a member of the CPI(M) Kerala State Secretariat and State Committee.

Personal life and Education
M. Swaraj was born at Pathar, Malappuram District. He attended SVHSS Palemad, Edakkara for his Secondary education. He then completed his BA degree in Economics from Mar Thoma College, Chungathara. He later pursued an LLB degree from Kerala Law Academy Law College, Thiruvananthapuram in 2004 and a Master's degree from Annamalai University in 2007.
Swaraj has been married to Saritha Menon, an HR professional, since 2008.

Political career
Swaraj entered politics through student activism. He was the Chairman of the Calicut University Students' Union in 1999 and rose to be the Secretary of SFI the Kerala State Committee in 2005. Later he became active in Democratic Youth Federation of India (DYFI), the youth wing of CPI(M), and was made President of its Kerala Unit in 2011. In 2013 and 2016 he was elected as the DYFI Kerala state Secretary. He was elected to Kerala Legislative Assembly from Thripunithura assembly constituency in 2016 Kerala Legislative Assembly election by defeating congress veteran and Excise Minister K. Babu by a margin of 4,467 votes. But in 2021 Swaraj lost against same K.Babu by a margin of 1232 votes.

Positions held
2005-2009 - Secretary, Students' Federation of India Kerala State Committee
2007-2015 - Member, CPI(M), Malappuram District Committee
2011-2013 - President, Democratic Youth Federation of India, Kerala State Committee
2013 - 2018 - Secretary, Democratic Youth Federation of India, Kerala State Committee
2015 - present - Member, CPI(M), Kerala State Committee
2016 - 2021 - MLA for Thrippunithura
2022 - present - Member, CPI(M), Kerala State Secretariat

Literary works 

 Cuba Jeevikkunnu
 Pookkalude Pusthakam
 Karupu Oru Niramella
 Pithrushoonyam: Sabhyavum Asabhyavum
 Venal Pakshi (Co-Writer)

References 

Living people
Communist Party of India (Marxist) politicians from Kerala
Kerala MLAs 2016–2021
People from Malappuram district
1979 births